Nawab Muhammad Hayat Khan Khattar  (1833–1901) was a Punjabi Muslim who served the Government of British India and rose to considerable distinction.

Early life
Muhammad Hayat Khan was born a son of Sardar Karam Khan, a Khattar chieftain, in the village of Wah, Punjab during the Sikh Empire.

At the end of the First Anglo-Sikh War, his father Karam Khan, cultivated a favourable relationship with officers of the East India Company, appointed to administer the Punjab under Sir Henry Lawrence.

In June–July 1848, he accompanied John Nicholson to the Margalla pass in a mission to capture a strategic tower near Taxila following an uprising of Sikh soldiers. During the course of the fight, he gained recognition for daringly rescuing Nicholson  when he became trapped in a hazardous situation. Thereafter, Nicholson and Karam Khan became close friends.

In late 1848, Karam Khan was killed whilst asleep, by his half-brother Fatteh Khan. His wife and children fled their ancestral village and sought refuge in the nearby Hazara region  where they met James Abbott, the then Deputy Commissioner of Hazara. Abbott in turn sent them to Nicholson, whom affected the restitution of the family to their estate and secured the education of Karam Khan's orphaned children.

Career
After attaining some basic education, especially a fluency in the Persian language, young Muhammad Hayat was appointed by Nicholson as his orderly and Persian interpreter, since he felt a responsibility towards the son of his late friend. Thereafter, Hayat Khan served as a close companion and aide to Nicholson throughout his campaigns and expeditions in Punjab and the 'Punjab Frontier' (areas that would later become part of the North West Frontier Province) and until his death in Delhi, during the Indian War of Independence (or Indian Mutiny) in September 1857.

In 1857, after Nicholson was mortally wounded in the assault on the Kashmir Gate, Delhi, Hyat Khan tended to him though his last 8–9 days of life, and according to tradition, Nicholson on his death-bed recommended the young man's services to Sir John Lawrence, then Chief Commissioner of the Punjab, asking him to reward and assist him in his future career. This proved to be the beginning of Khan's distinguished career spread out over many decades.

Soon after the Mutiny/Rebellion, he was appointed a Thanedar (police officer) at Talagang in Punjab, and was soon transferred to the civil side of administration, as a Tehsildar (junior revenue officer). In 1862, he was then promoted an Extra Assistant Commissioner and sent out to Bannu, and served in that station and nearby Kohat under Sir Louis Cavagnari, then Assistant Commissioner there. In 1864, he was sent on a mission to Afghanistan and in that same year, wrote his famous Hyat i Afghan (Afghanistan and its Inhabitants) in Urdu and also translated it himself into Persian, which was published in 1864 (later translated into English by H. Priestley, ICS, published 1875): probably still one of the best works on the subject.

In 1872, Khan was promoted an Assistant Commissioner and due to his sterling work, given the award of the Companion of the Order of the Star of India (CSI) on 31 May in the Birthday Honours; and later, appointed Assistant Political Agent in the Kurram tribal agency. During the Second Anglo-Afghan War, when General Sir Frederick Roberts (later Field Marshal, Lord Roberts of Kandahar) was sent in command of the Kurram Valley Field Force, Khan was made one of his main native aides.

After the conclusion of the war, Khan returned to civil administrative service in the Punjab, and in due course was moved to the judicial service. Between 1880 and 1888, he remained a District and Sessions Judge in various places. In 1888–89, he became a member of the Punjab Board of Revenue and remained in this position for quite some time, finally being chosen to represent the Muslim zamindars (landowners) as a member of the Punjab Legislative Council in 1897.

In 1899, he was granted the personal title of Nawab in recognition of his long and particularly distinguished services and, in the words of an Englishman, '...a previously well-established Wah family [now] achieved new heights in the annals of British India'.

Nawab Muhammad Hayat Khan died in his ancestral village, Wah, in 1901.

Contributions to Muslim education
Muhammad Hyat Khan was a very close friend and confidant of the senior Muslim thinker, scholar, writer and educational reformer Sir Syed Ahmad Khan and remained very active under his guidance in the establishment of the Muhammadan Anglo-Oriental College at Aligarh (later Aligarh Muslim University) and indeed presided over the 1888, 1889 and 1890 annual sessions of the 'Muhammadan Educational Conference' initiated by Sir Syed. He also played an active role in promoting Muslim socio-cultural uplift in his home province of Punjab, and was one of the first twenty or so Punjabi princes and nobles to donate funds for the establishment of the new University College, Punjab (later to develop in the University of the Punjab) in 1870.

Successors
Nawab Muhammad Hyat had many offspring, and two of them, from his senior wife Zainab Khatun, daughter of S. Ghulam Jilani (a Minister in Kapurthala State), were to achieve particular distinction and fame in years to come: Nawab Sir Liaqat Hyat Khan (born 1887), Sir Sikandar Hyat Khan (born 1892).

References
Notes

Citations

1833 births
1901 deaths
Punjabi people
Indian Muslims
People from British India
Companions of the Order of the Star of India
History of Punjab
Muhammad
People from Attock District
All articles with a promotional tone
Articles with unsourced statements from January 2020